Luiz Henrique may refer to:

Footballers
 Luiz Henrique Rosa (1938–1985), Brazilian footballer and musician
 Luiz Henrique (footballer, born 1943), full name Luiz Henrique Ferreira de Menezes, Brazilian football manager and midfielder
 Luiz Henrique (footballer, born 1949), full name Luiz Henrique Byron de Mello, Brazilian footballer
 Luiz Henrique (footballer, born 1981), full name Luiz Henrique da Silva Alves, Brazilian football forward
 Luiz Henrique (footballer, born 1982), full name Luiz Henrique de Souza Santos, Brazilian football defender
 Luiz Henrique Tosta (born 1985), Brazilian football defender
 Luiz Henrique (footballer, born 1985), full name Luiz Henrique de Oliveira, Brazilian football attacking midfielder
 Luiz Henrique (footballer, born 1987), full name Luiz Henrique Santos, Brazilian football striker
 Luiz Henrique (footballer, born 1997), Brazilian football midfielder
 Luiz Henrique (footballer, born 1998), full name Luiz Henrique dos Santos Júnior, Brazilian football left-back
 Luiz Henrique (footballer, born March 1999), Brazilian football midfielder
 Luiz Henrique (footballer, born May 1999), Brazilian football midfielder
 Luiz Henrique (footballer, born 2001), Brazilian football forward

Politicians
 Luiz Henrique da Silveira (1940–2015), Brazilian politician and lawyer
 Luiz Henrique Mandetta (born 1964), Brazilian doctor and politician

See also
 Luís Henrique (disambiguation)
 Luis Enrique (disambiguation)